Lunar New Year Fireworks Display in Hong Kong is an annual event to celebrate the Chinese New Year in Hong Kong. It is held on The Second Day of Lunar New Year above the sky of Victoria Harbour in the evening.

History
In 1982, to celebrate its 150th anniversary, Jardine Matheson sponsored the first fireworks display event.  The event received good public response. Since then, it became an annual event of Chinese New Year as a greeting to Hong Kong citizens.

Other events
Fireworks shows similar to this event are also held in Victoria Harbour on the common calendar's New Year's Eve on December 31 and the anniversary of Hong Kong's handover from the United Kingdom to China that happened on June 30, 1997.

Festivals in Hong Kong
1982 establishments in Hong Kong
Recurring events established in 1982
Annual events in Hong Kong
Fireworks events in Asia
Festivals established in 1982